The 2005 Banka Koper Slovenia Open was a women's tennis tournament played on outdoor hard courts. It was the inaugural edition of the Slovenia Open, and was part of the WTA Tier IV tournaments of the 2005 women's professional tennis season. It was held in Portorož, Slovenia, in mid-September, 2006.

Points and prize money

Point distribution

Prize money

* per team

Finals

Singles 

 Klára Koukalová defeated  Katarina Srebotnik, 6–2, 4–6, 6–3

Doubles 

 Anabel Medina Garrigues /  Roberta Vinci claimed the title, when  Jelena Kostanić /  Katarina Srebotnik, 6–4, 5–7, 6–2

References 

Banka Koper Slovenia Open
Banka Koper Slovenia Open
2005 in Slovenian tennis